The 1963 Kansas State Wildcats football team represented Kansas State University in the 1963 NCAA University Division football season. The team's head football coach was Doug Weaver. The Wildcats played their home games in Memorial Stadium. 1963 saw the Wildcats finish with a record of 2–7 and a 1–5 record in Big Eight Conference play. The Wildcats scored only 91 points while giving up 222. They finished seventh in the Big Eight.

Kansas State and Oklahoma State were scheduled to play on November 23, but that game was cancelled due to the assassination of John F. Kennedy on November 22.

Schedule

References

Kansas State
Kansas State Wildcats football seasons
Kansas State Wildcats football